Baraguru Ramachandrappa (born 18 October 1947) is an Indian essayist, lyricist, screenwriter, film director, socialist, writer, novelist, predominantly works in Kannada language and President of the Textbook Revision Committee, in Karnataka Text Books Society (KTBS) from May 2015. In 2008, he was given an honorary doctorate by the Kuvempu University and Rani Channamma University, Belagavi, Karnataka.

Ramachandrappa won the National Film Award for Best Lyrics in 2002 for "Baruthe Ve Nav Baruthe Ve" in the film Thaayi and was given the Pampa Award in 2011 by the Government of Karnataka for his contribution to Kannada literature. His directorial debut film, Ondu Oorina Kathe (1978), fetched him the State award for best story writer for the year 1978–79. Since then, he has been the recipient of several awards, both national and international. His novel Suntaragali won the Karnataka Sahitya Academy award.

Biography
Ramachandrappa was born to Kenchamma and Rangadasappa in Baraguru village in the Tumkur district, Karnataka state. After completing his studies, he worked as a professor in the Kannada department of Bangalore University. He was the president of the Kannada Sahitya Academy for two years. He has made notable contributions as the Chairman of Kannada Development Authority as well as a member of various educational institutions, Doordarshan, literary and film based organizations. His contribution to Kannada literature includes novels, collection of poetry, short stories, drama, edition of other works and research and criticism for which he was awarded by the Karnataka Sahitya Academy. Class based society and its challenges is a theme that is well expressed in his creative works.

Literary works
Research and criticism
 Saahithya Matthu Raajakaarana
 Samskruthi Mattu Srujanasheelathe
 Bandaaya Sahithya Meemanse
 Samskruthi - Upa samskruthi
 Vartamaana
 Rajakeeya chinthane
 Samskruthi: Shrama mattu srujanasheelathe
 Parampareyondige Pisumathu
 Kannada Sahityavemba Swatantrya Horata
 Shabdavillada Yuddha
 Cinema Ondu Janapada Kale
 Maryaadastha Manushyaraagona

Novels
 Sootra
 Ukkina Kote
 Ondu Oorina Kathe
 Benki
 Surya
 Sangappana Saahasagalu
 Seelu Nela
 Bharatha Nagari
 Gaagina Mane
 Swapna Mantapa
 Shabari

Collections of poems
 Kanasina Kannik
 Marakutika
 Nettaralli Nenda Hoovu
 Gulaama Geethe
 Maguvina Haadu
 Kaantesadalli Kavya (anthology)

Short stories
 Suntaragaali
 Kappu Nelada Kempu Kaalu
 Ondu Oorina Kathegalu (anthology)

Drama
 Kappu halage
 Kote

Awards
Karnataka State Film Awards
 1978–79: Best Story Writer – Ondu Oorina Kathe
 1978–79: Best Dialogue Writer – Ondu Oorina Kathe
 1983-84: Second Best Film - Benki'''
 1983–84: Best Story Writer - Benki 1986–87: Second Best Film - Surya 1988–89: Jury Special Award (Lyrics) – Kote 1996–97: Best Film of Social Concern - Karadipura 1996–97: Best Dialogue Writer - Janumada Jodi 1999–00: Best Story Writer - Hagalu Vesha 1999–00: Best Lyricist - Hagalu Vesha 2002–03: Second Best Film - Kshaama 2003–04: Second Best Film - Shanthi 2005–06: Best Film of Social Concern - Thayi 2005–06: Best Lyricist - Thayi 2007–08: Best Children's Film - Ekalavya 2008–09: Best Story Writer - Ugragami 2009–10: Best Film of Social Concern - Shabari 2011: Best Lyricist - Bhagirathi 2012: Best Story Writer - Angulimala 2014: Puttanna Kanagal Award

Filmography
Ramachandrappa has been making films for more than thirty years. His debut film Ondu Oorina Kathe won him the Best Story Writer Award, Karnataka Government Film Awards in 1978. He has made several documentaries and most of his thirteen feature films have won either a Karnataka State Award or a National Film Award. His film Shanti, with only one artist entered the Guinness Book of World Records''. In 2014 Karnataka State "Puttanna Kanagal Award" (Puttanna Kanagal was among the front runners in Kannada cinema's most successful film directors. In his memory and honor, this award is presented to the directors every year during the Karnataka State Awards function).

As Director

Others

References

External links
 Sapnaonline.com
 Rediff.com
 Chilume.com
 

Screenwriters from Karnataka
Kannada film directors
Bangalore University alumni
Living people
Bandaya writers
Kannada-language writers
Indian socialists
Kannada screenwriters
People from Tumkur district
Indian documentary filmmakers
20th-century Indian film directors
Indian male screenwriters
20th-century Indian dramatists and playwrights
Film directors from Karnataka
21st-century Indian film directors
Novelists from Karnataka
Poets from Karnataka
20th-century Indian male writers
Best Lyrics National Film Award winners
Recipients of the Rajyotsava Award 2003
1947 births